Koshikawa (written: 越川) is a Japanese surname. Notable people with the surname include:

, Japanese high jumper
, Japanese volleyball player

Japanese-language surnames